Yonatan Irrazábal Condines (born 12 February 1988) is a Uruguayan footballer who plays as a goalkeeper for Rentistas in the Uruguayan Primera División.

Career

Tampico Madero
In November 2018, Irrazábal moved to Mexican club Tampico Madero. He made his league debut for the club on 13 January 2019 in a 2–1 away defeat to Atlético San Luis.

References

External links
Yonatan Irrazábal at Football Database

1988 births
Living people
Uruguayan people of Basque descent
Defensor Sporting players
C.A. Cerro players
Tampico Madero F.C. footballers
C.A. Rentistas players
Uruguayan Primera División players
Ascenso MX players
Uruguayan footballers
Uruguay youth international footballers
Association football goalkeepers
Uruguayan expatriate footballers
Expatriate footballers in Mexico
Uruguayan expatriate sportspeople in Mexico
Footballers from Montevideo